Muhamad Radhi bin Mat Din (born 17 July 1965) is a Malaysian football coach, former footballer, and politician.

Football career

He spent his entire career by playing in midfield for Kedah FA, where he was also the longest serving captain in club history starting from 1991 to 2000. Radhi made his debut in 1986 and cemented his place in the first team in the 1987 season, succeeding Lee Kin Hong as Kedah team captain in 1991.

Radhi was an integral part in the golden era of the Darul Aman based club during the 1980s and 1990s where Kedah reached the Malaysia Cup final matches for seven times from 1987 to 1993. He collected two Malaysia Cup winners medal in 1990 and 1993; Division 1 title in 1993; and FA Cup in 1996. After Kedah won the League and FA Cup championship in 1993, Radhi was honoured with the Malaysian Best Player.

Radhi had a good goal-scoring record, tackle, corner-kick taker and pass well. He represented Malaysia for about four years from 1989 to 1993. Radhi also known by the nickname "Captain Marvel" among Kedah fans during his playing careers with his similar characters of English former footballer Bryan Robson.

Radhi played for the Malaysia national football team at the 1989 Sea Games and won gold medal.

After his playing career ended, he was employed by Kedah, serving as their second tactician behind Mohd Azraai Khor Abdullah alongside his former teammate and Kedah legendary goalkeeper Ahmad Sabri Ismail which three of them generated Kedah to clinched the double treble titles in 2006/07 and 2007/08 M.League seasons.

Political career

On 14 April 2018, Radhi was announced as a candidate of Pan Malaysian Islamic Party (PAS) for the federal constituency of Pokok Sena, Kedah in the 2018 Malaysia general election. In the election, Radhi garnered 23401 votes and was defeated by the incumbent Mahfuz Omar from Parti Amanah Negara (AMANAH) of Pakatan Harapan (PH) by majority of 5558 votes.

Election results

References

1965 births
Living people
People from Kedah
Malaysian people of Malay descent
Malaysian Muslims
Malaysian footballers
Malaysia international footballers
Kedah Darul Aman F.C. players
Southeast Asian Games silver medalists for Malaysia
Southeast Asian Games medalists in football
Competitors at the 1989 Southeast Asian Games
Association football midfielders
Malaysian sportsperson-politicians
Malaysian Islamic Party politicians
21st-century Malaysian politicians